Sam Obst (born ) is a rugby league footballer who plays for Australian Queensland Cup club Northern Pride. Obst originates from the rugby league stronghold of Redcliffe and attended Southern Cross Catholic College.

Whitehaven
Obst joined Whitehaven in 2004 and was voted National League One Player of the Year for 2004. He went on to join Wakefield Trinity Wildcats.

Wakefield Trinity Wildcats
The Australian had an excellent season with the Wildcats, especially during the latter half of 2006 under John Kear. He later re-signed with Wakefield Trinity Wildcats for another 2 years to keep him as a player there till 2009. He has recently taken up horse riding. He has recently been handed a new 2-year deal by head coach John Kear, and has accepted, keeping him at the club until 2011. In 2008 and 09 Sam received the club's man of steel (best player for club) He wears no.14 on his back.

Hull F.C.
In 2011 Sam Obst signed a 2-year deal with Super League club Hull F.C. The deal is completed for an undisclosed fee as part of the rescue plan for Wakefield Trinity Wildcats.

Keighley Cougars
On 1 December 2011 it was announced that Obst had signed a 12-month deal with Co-operative Championship club Keighley Cougars. Sam has followed in his father's (Tony Obst played for Keighley in the 1970s) footsteps and re-joined two of his former teammates in Michael Korkidas and cougars player-coach Jason Demetriou.

Northern Pride
In 2013 Obst played for the Cairns based Intrust Super Cup team, the Northern Pride.

References

External links 
 Statistics at rugbyleagueproject.org
 Sam Obst Wakefield Profile
 Wildcats complete move for Obst
 Aussie Obst sticks with Wildcats

Australian rugby league players
1980 births
Wakefield Trinity players
Living people
Australian people of Russian descent
Australian expatriate sportspeople in England
Keighley Cougars players
Northern Pride RLFC players
Rugby league halfbacks
Sydney Roosters players
Rugby league hookers
Place of birth missing (living people)